Alamorio (from Spanish Álamo and Río meaning "poplar tree" and "river") is an unincorporated community in Imperial County, California. The community resides along the Alamo River and California State Route 78.

A post office operated at Alamorio from 1909 to 1917.

References

Unincorporated communities in Imperial County, California
El Centro metropolitan area
Imperial Valley
Unincorporated communities in California